The Fountain of San Maurizio, also called Samoreci, is a medieval public fountain located at the intersection of Via di Pantaneto and Via San Girolamo in Siena, region of Tuscany, Italy. It is located just outside one set of medieval city walls and the Arco di San Maurizio.

History
Siena is a city without rivers, and during a siege was highly dependent on its aqueducts and urban water sources. Unlike other fountains in the city, it has no cover. A fountain at the site is documented since 1293, prior to this it was a simple cistern. In 1351, the  Biccherna funded construction of the fountain which was only completed in 1452. It has been reconstructed across the ages. The center has a coat of arms (1583) of the Medici.

References

Fountains in Siena